The Shahid Shiroudi Stadium formerly known as Amjadiyeh Stadium is a sports stadium in Tehran, Iran. It is currently used for athletics and held football matches until 2009.

The stadium is able to seat 30,000 people and was opened in 1942. It was called Amjadieh Stadium until the Iranian Revolution.

In September 2015 it was announced the stadium and the complex would undergo a massive renovation.

History
The stadium is one of the oldest sports stadiums in Iran. It was built in 1942 and was located in North of Tehran at the time of opening, while it is now in center of Tehran. The stadium has played host to many sporting, cultural, and national events as well as political meetings. Ever since Iran national football team was formed, they played their home matches in Amjadieh Stadium before Aryamehr Stadium was constructed. It was also home to Taj S.C. (Esteghlal F.C.) and Persepolis F.C. before Azadi Stadium was built. It was also home to Shahin F.C. before and after the Iranian Revolution.

It has also hosted the 1968 AFC Asian Cup finals. The Asian Club Championship was also held in Amjadieh Stadium in 1970. Additionally, Amjadieh stadium along with Aryamehr Stadium and Apadana Stadium (under the name of Persepolis stadium) was the host of preliminary round of the football matches at the 1974 Asian Games. The stadium has also been the venue for the AFC Youth Championship 2000.

Cultural, political and military operations
 During the Coronation of the Mohammad Reza Shah and the Shahbanou of Iran in 1967, many events took place in Amjadieh Stadium, including the Coronation Parade.
 The stadium was to be the final departing site for Operation Eagle Claw, the aborted mission to rescue 52 American hostages being held in Tehran during the Iran Hostage Crisis. The proposed extraction would have involved a rescue force being transported to the embassy, releasing the hostages, and then escorting the hostages across the main road in front of the embassy to the stadium, where helicopters would have retrieved the entire contingent.
 On February 24, 1981, the Mojahedin-e-Khalq party held its public meeting in Tehran at the Amjadieh Stadium, around 40,000 people attended.

Naming

The stadium was named after Shahid Ali Akbar Shiroodi, a Cobra helicopter pilot who was killed in the Iran–Iraq War.

Gallery

References

Football venues in Iran
Sports venues in Tehran
AFC Asian Cup stadiums
Multi-purpose stadiums in Iran
Sports venues completed in 1939
1939 establishments in Iran
Asian Games football venues